"Distress and Coma" is the 15th maxi-single by The Gazette. The single comes in two different types: the Optical Impression and Auditory Impression, the first contains a DVD with the music video for the song "Distress and Coma", and the latter comes with a bonus track instead.  In accordance with the release of the single, The Gazette hosted a special event which a lucky purchaser got to attend.

Track listing

Distress and Coma: Optical Impression

Distress and Coma: Auditory Impression

References

2009 singles
The Gazette (band) songs
King Records (Japan) singles
2009 songs